MYW may refer to:
 Maendeleo Ya Wanawake, a Kenyan women's organization
 Mennonite Your Way, a hospitality exchange service that caters to Mennonites
 Mtwara Airport, Tanzania (by IATA airport code)
 MyAir, a former Italian airline (by ICAO airline designator)